Admiralty MRT station is an elevated Mass Rapid Transit (MRT) station on the North South line (NSL) in Woodlands, Singapore. Located along Woodlands Avenue 7 near the junctions of Woodlands Avenue 6 and Woodlands Drive 71, the station primarily serves the residential precincts in the eastern part of Woodlands New Town. This station took its name from a former Royal Navy base located on the northern coast of Singapore.

First announced in November 1991 as part of the Woodlands Extension, the station opened on 10 February 1996. The station, like the other stations on the extension, features an improved station layout to facilitate better passenger flow, larger commercial space, and improved integration with other modes of transport.

History

After the Branch line (from the Jurong East to Choa Chu Kang stations) opened in 1990, the Woodlands MRT line was envisioned so as to connect between Yishun and Choa Chu Kang stations. Admiralty station was one of the original four stations announced to be built as part of the Extension in November 1991.

The station opened on 10 February 1996 along with the other stations on the Woodlands Extension. Television screens were installed at Admiralty station, along with Woodlands, Marsiling and Yew Tee stations.

Admiralty station was part of the first batch of ten stations to have additional bicycle parking facilities under the National Cycling Plan announced in 2010. In 2012, half-height platform screen doors were installed at this station as part of the Land Transport Authority's (LTA) programme to improve safety in MRT stations. Between 2012 and 2013, high-volume low-speed fans were installed at this station as part of a network-wide programme to improve ventilation at the platforms of elevated stations.

Incidents
On 2 March 2007, 2,900 commuters were stranded as train services between the Admiralty and Kranji MRT stations were disrupted for about 45 minutes. Bridging bus services were deployed to ferry the passengers to Kranji.

On 7 June 2017, a 34-year-old man was arrested for public nuisance after leaving a luggage bag unattended at the bicycle bay of Admiralty station. The police were alerted to the case at 8.45 am. Officers and station staff quickly traced the owner of the luggage bag and arrested him for causing public nuisance. Initial investigations showed that the man had left the bag unattended while he went to make a purchase at a convenience store. Personal belongings such as clothes, toiletries and medication were found in the bag.

Station details

The station serves the North South line and is situated between the Woodlands and Sembawang stations. The station code is NS10 as reflected on official maps. Like all stations on the Woodlands Extension, it has a kampung-style roof, with a blue scheme to blend into the surroundings. At the concourse level, unlike the original stations on the NSEWL network, the station control room is located at one side of the fare gates instead of between two sets to allow better monitoring of crowd movement by the station staff. In addition, the station allows more commercial spaces for shops.

The station, like the other Extension stations, incorporates features allowing improved transfers between the MRT and other modes of transport. The station also has taxi stands and more than 42 spaces for bicycle parking. With four entrances, the station is connected to the other surrounding bus stops and nearby Housing and Development Board (HDB) flats via covered pathways. Escalators were installed at overhead bridges connecting to the station.

Located along Woodlands Avenue 7, the station is close to schools such as Admiralty Primary School, Greenwood Primary School, Riverside Primary School and Admiralty Secondary School. The station also serve Kampung Admiralty which is located beside the station. Kampung Admiralty consists of F&B outlets and retail shops.

Notes and references

Notes

References

External links

 

Railway stations in Singapore opened in 1996
1996 establishments in Singapore
Woodlands, Singapore
Mass Rapid Transit (Singapore) stations